Matthew 6:14–15 are the fourteenth and fifteenth verses of the sixth chapter of the Gospel of Matthew in the New Testament and is part of the Sermon on the Mount. These verses come just after the Lord's Prayer and explain one of the statements in that prayer.

Content

In the King James Version of the Bible the text reads:
For if you forgive men their trespasses, your heavenly 
Father will also forgive you: But if ye forgive not men their 
trespasses, neither will your Father forgive your trespasses.

The World English Bible translates the passage as:
“For if you forgive men their trespasses, your heavenly 
Father will also forgive you. But if you don’t forgive men their 
trespasses, neither will your Father forgive your trespasses.

The Novum Testamentum Graece text is:
Ἐὰν γὰρ ἀφῆτε τοῖς ἀνθρώποις τὰ παραπτώματα αὐτῶν,
ἀφήσει καὶ ὑμῖν ὁ Πατὴρ ὑμῶν ὁ οὐράνιος
ἐὰν δὲ μὴ ἀφῆτε τοῖς ἀνθρώποις, οὐδὲ ὁ Πατὴρ ὑμῶν ἀφήσει τὰ παραπτώματα ὑμῶν.

For a collection of other versions see BibleHub Matthew 6:14-15.

Analysis
The Lord's Prayer is appended by two verses on forgiveness.

These verses parallel Matthew 6:12, but while that one speaks of debts this one speaks of trespasses. It states that for a person to earn God's forgiveness they must also be willing to forgive others. Those who do not forgive will not be forgiven by God. It is also similar and becomes clearer in subject matter to the Parable of the Unforgiving Servant found in Matthew. Coogan comments that "reciprocity is vital in the economy of God".

Commentary from the Church Fathers
Rabanus Maurus: By the word Amen, He shows that without doubt the Lord will bestow all things that are rightly asked, and by those that do not fail in observing the annexed condition, For if ye forgive men their sins, your heavenly Father will also forgive you your sins.

Augustine:  Here we should not overlook that of all the petitions enjoined by the Lord, He judged that most worthy of further enforcement, which relates to forgiveness of sins, in which He would have us merciful; which is the only means of escaping misery.

Pseudo-Chrysostom: He does not say that God will first forgive us, and that we should after forgive our debtors. For God knows how treacherous the heart of man is, and that though they should have received forgiveness themselves, yet they do not forgive their debtors; therefore He instructs us first to forgive, and we shall be forgiven after.

Augustine:  Whoever does not forgive him that in true sorrow seeks forgiveness, let him not suppose that his sins are by any means forgiven of the Lord.

Cyprian:  For no excuse will abide you in the day of judgment, when you will be judged by your own sentence, and as you have dealt towards others, will be dealt with yourself.

Jerome: But if that which is written, I said, Ye are gods, but ye shall die like men, (Ps. 83:6, 7.) is said to those who for their sins deserve to become men instead of gods, then they to whom sins are forgiven are rightly called men.

Chrysostom: He mentions heaven and the Father to claim our attention, for nothing so likens you to God, as to forgive him who has injured you. And it were indeed unmeet should the son of such a Father become a slave, and should one who has a heavenly vocation live as of this earth, and of this life only.

References

Sources

Further reading
Schweizer, Eduard. The Good News According to Matthew. Atlanta: John Knox Press, 1975

06:14
Lord's Prayer